The Atlanta Bicycle Coalition (ABC) is Atlanta's largest non-profit bicycling advocate.  ABC was founded in 1991 to "create a healthier, more livable Atlanta by making it safer, easier, and more attractive to bicycle for fun, fitness, and transportation."

Programs, initiatives, and events
One of the highest profile programs sponsored by ABC is called Share the Road.  This public awareness program aims to educate both cyclists and motorists that shared use of the road is safest and most enjoyable for all. ABC also teaches Effective Cycling classes as part of its work to educate the public on the benefits of cycling. In addition, ABC offers a number of services, like bicycle counts, bicycle valets for events, and bicycle rack projects (in cooperation with Sopo Bicycle Co-op).

Atlanta Streets Alive
The ABC organizes Atlanta Streets Alive, a ciclovía, which in Spanish means a temporary closing of the street to automobiles for use by people participating in recreational activity, such as bicycling, roller-skating, jogging, strolling, scootering, or skipping. The free event takes place in Downtown Atlanta and the Old Fourth Ward, mostly on Edgewood Avenue. Sections of Auburn Avenue, Park Place, and Equitable Place are also closed to automobile traffic. The event kickoff is held at Woodruff Park. In addition to cultural events, free group activities are offered to participants, including tango, yoga, soccer, hula hooping, and break dancing.  In recent years, since 2012, the Atlanta Streets Alive has been extended to other areas of Atlanta, including two being held in DeKalb County, Georgia, in 2015 and 2016, outside of the city limits of Atlanta, nearby in downtown Decatur, Georgia and in the city of Clarkston, Georgia.  In addition, the Sweet Auburn Curb Market hosts the Urban Picnic, offering a variety of food trucks for hungry participants. The event is meant to promote exercise, good health, and physical activity. Tens of thousands of people attend the events, which are held in the spring, summer, or autumn months to take advantage of Atlanta's mild spring and fall climates.

The Mobile Social
Founded in March 2011, The Mobile Social is a monthly, no-drop, group bicycle ride sponsored by the Atlanta Bicycle Coalition. In response to the Critical Mass cycling events, members of the Atlanta Bicycle Coalition developed a social ride that is formal, organized, and aims to promote the following initiatives:
1. Get more people on bikes.
2. Explore Atlanta (west to east, north to south).
3. Support and love local businesses.
4. Create community through cycling.

Bicycle Friendly Neighborhoods

Connecting the City

Resources for Bicycle Commuters 
The ABC has gathered a broad range of resources to provide information about riding safely on city streets.

See also 
Cycling in Atlanta
List of United States bicycle advocacy organizations

References

Cycling in Atlanta
United States bicycle advocacy groups
Cycling organizations in the United States
Organizations based in Atlanta
Organizations established in 1991
1991 establishments in Georgia (U.S. state)